Ulla Barding-Poulsen (1 July 1912 – 15 August 2000) was a Danish fencer. She competed in the women's individual foil event at the 1936 and 1952 Summer Olympics. In the 1936 Summer Olympics, she made it to the quarter-finals where she was eliminated after winning one bout and losing four bouts. In the 1952 Summer Olympics, at the age of 40, she was eliminated in round one after winning two bouts and losing three bouts.

References

1912 births
2000 deaths
Danish female foil fencers
Olympic fencers of Denmark
Fencers at the 1936 Summer Olympics
Fencers at the 1952 Summer Olympics
Sportspeople from Copenhagen